Stefano Caldoro (born 13 December 1960 in Campobasso, Molise) is an Italian politician. He is the current leader of the New PSI.

Biography
Stefano Caldoro was born on 3 December 1960 in Campobasso. His father was the former socialist deputy Antonio Caldoro. He has a degree in Political Science. In 1985 he was elected in the Regional Council of Campania, where he has held the position of Chairman of the Planning and Territory Commission and the position of Group's leader of the Italian Socialist Party.

In the 1992 general election he was elected in the Chamber of Deputies. In 1994, after the dissolution of the Italian Socialist Party, Caldoro joined the centre-right coalition, led by Silvio Berlusconi.

In 2001, Caldoro served as Undersecretary and then as Deputy Minister of Education, University and Research in the Berlusconi II Cabinet. Subsequently, he served as Minister for the Implementation of the Government Program in the Berlusconi III Cabinet.

On 24 June 2007 Caldoro was appointed secretary of the New Italian Socialist Party. He held office until 2011, when he was appointed president of the same party.

In the 2008 general election Caldoro was again elected in the Chamber of Deputies with The People of Freedom.

At the 2010 regional election Caldoro was elected President of Campania with 54.3% of the votes, defeating the Mayor of Salerno Vincenzo De Luca. However, in the following regional election of 2015, he was defeated in turn by De Luca.

References

1960 births
Living people
People from Campobasso
Italian Socialist Party politicians
Reformist Socialist Party politicians
Socialist Party (Italy, 1996) politicians
Forza Italia politicians
New Italian Socialist Party politicians
The People of Freedom politicians
Forza Italia (2013) politicians
Government ministers of Italy
Deputies of Legislature XI of Italy
Deputies of Legislature XVI of Italy
Politicians of Molise